John Bentley (born 16 April 1951 in Kingston upon Hull, East Riding of Yorkshire, England) is an English bass guitarist. He played bass for the band Squeeze from 1980 to 1982, appearing on the albums Argybargy and East Side Story, as well as Sweets from a Stranger. Squeeze initially split up in 1982, and upon reforming in 1985, band leaders Chris Difford and Glenn Tilbrook replaced Bentley with Keith Wilkinson.

Bentley re-joined Squeeze for the band's 2007 reformation, playing on the band's "Quintessential Tour 2007" through the US and UK; although he left the band following two British festival appearances in 2015. Tillbrook reflected on Bentley's role in the band:

Bentley's solo album was released on vinyl and iTunes in 2014.

In 2018, Bentley's band The Buzniks released their self-titled first album through 3Ms music.

References

1951 births
Living people
Musicians from Kingston upon Hull
People from Deptford
English bass guitarists
English male guitarists
Male bass guitarists
Squeeze (band) members
Musicians from Kent